Events in the year 2018 in South Sudan.

Incumbents
 President: Salva Kiir Mayardit
 Vice President: James Wani Igga

Events
 Ongoing – Sudanese nomadic conflicts
 Ongoing since June 2016 – armed clashes in Wau State between the Dinka-dominated Sudan People's Liberation Army (SPLA) and local opposition forces.

9 September – Yirol Let L-410 Turbolet crash

Deaths

20 April – James Ajonga Mawut, army commander (b. 1961).

References

 
2010s in South Sudan 
Years of the 21st century in South Sudan 
South Sudan 
South Sudan